B.B.B is the seventh extended play by South Korean girl group Dal Shabet. The album was digitally and physically released on January 8, 2014. "B.B.B (Big Baby Baby)" served as the promotional single.

Background
The release of Dal Shabet's album was announced on December 12, 2013. Happy Face Entertainment revealed, "Dal Shabet will be returning in the second week of January. They will be releasing an album with a mature look." On January 2, 2014, Dal Shabet released concept photos for their upcoming album, which show off a darker and more mature side to the group. A music video teaser for 'B.B.B (Big Baby Baby)' was released on January 6, 2014.  The album was digitally and physically released on January 8, 2014.

Composition
The album is composed of six tracks; five new songs and one instrumental. The promotional track was co-created by famous Korean producer Shinsadong Tiger and producing team Beomi, Nangi.  Beomi, Nangi also created track four, "Memories of You". Producing team BEATAMIN lent their help with the creation of "REWIND". BEATAMIN has previously worked with Dal Shabet by creating their songs "Enter Dalshabet (Intro)" and "Come Closer (ft. Nassun)" from their album Bang Bang. This album marks the second time the members of Dal Shabet became involved with the production of their music. Subin wrote the lyrics and composed the song "Just Pass By", which was co-written by, and features, BTOB's Ilhoon.

Promotion
On January 5, 2014, Dal Shabet appeared on the military television show 'Real Men', where they performed their title track for the troops.  On January 8, 2014, the group held a comeback showcase at 'Dome Art Hall' for their fans. The showcase was used to publicly promote and reveal their album for the first time.  The group began televised promotions of their album on January 9, 2014, by appearing on MNET's 'M! Countdown'. The group ended the main televised promotional cycle of B.B.B (Big Baby Baby) on February 23, 2014, on SBS The Music Trend.

Track listing

Chart performance

Single chart

Album chart

Sales and certifications

References

2014 EPs
Dal Shabet albums
Korean-language EPs
Kakao M EPs